Lein may refer to:

People with that name
Allen Lein (1913–2003), American endocrinologist and medical school professor
Anatoly Lein (1931–2018), Soviet-born American chess Grandmaster
Lars O. Lein (1874–1958), American farmer and politician
Simonetta Lein (born 1983), Italian-American columnist and model

Other
Lein (Neckar), a river of Baden-Württemberg, Germany, tributary of the Neckar
Lein (Kocher), a river of Baden-Württemberg, Germany, tributary of the Kocher
Forbregd/Lein, two small adjoining villages in the municipality of Verdal in Trøndelag county, Norway
Leiningen (software), the command lein is used for this packaging software

See also
Col du Lein, a high mountain pass in the Alps in Switzerland